LLDC may refer to:

Landlocked developing countries
Least Developed Countries
London Legacy Development Corporation
Lancashire Learning Disability Consortium